UHKD may refer to:

UHKD, the ICAO code for Dzyomgi Airport, Khabarovsk Krai, Russia
Union of Hong Kong Dockers, the affiliate of the Hong Kong Confederation of Trade Unions